The following peoples are officially recognized minor indigenous peoples of Russia. Many of them are included into the Common List of Minor Indigenous Peoples of Russia approved by the government of Russia on March 24, 2000 and updated in subsequent years.

These peoples satisfy the following criteria:
To live in their historical territory;
To preserve traditional way of life, occupations, and trades;
To self-recognize themselves as a separate ethnicity;
To have a population of at least 50,000 within Russia.

Some of them, such as Soyots, were recognized only after the dissolution of the Soviet Union.

These peoples subject to benefits according to a number of laws aimed at preservation and support of these ethnicities.

Ten of these peoples count less than 1,000 and 11 of them live beyond the Arctic Circle.

Far North

Far North is the part of Russia which lies mainly beyond the Arctic Circle.
Ainus (Айны): Kamchatka Krai, Sakhalin Oblast
Aleuts (Алеуты): Kamchatka Krai
Alyutors (Алюторцы): Kamchatka Krai
Chukchis (чукчи): Chukotka Autonomous Okrug, Magadan Oblast, Kamchatka Krai
Chuvans (чуванцы): Chukotka Autonomous Okrug, Magadan Oblast
Dolgans (долганы): Krasnoyarsk Krai, Sakha Republic
Enets (*) (энцы) (Yenets, Russian plural: Entsy, obsolete: Yenisei Samoyeds, Yenisei Ostyak, Kets): Krasnoyarsk Krai
Siberian Yupik (Yuit, Yupigyt, эскимосы): Chukotka Autonomous Okrug
Chaplino
Naukan
Sirenik Yupik
Itelmens (ительмены): Kamchatka Krai, Magadan Oblast
Kamchadals (камчадалы, a general term for mixed population of Kamchatka Peninsula): Kamchatka Krai
Kereks (кереки): Chukotka Autonomous Okrug
Komi peoples formerly known as Komi-Izhemtsy, Izhma Komi (Коми-ижемцы, alt. name: Izvataz): north of the Komi Republic
Koryaks (коряки): Kamchatka Krai, Chukotka Autonomous Okrug, Magadan Oblast
Nenets (*) (Russian plural: Nentsy, old Russian name Samoyeds) (ненцы): Yamalo-Nenets Autonomous Okrug, Krasnoyarsk Krai, Khanty–Mansi Autonomous Okrug, Arkhangelsk Oblast, Komi Republic
Nganasans (Tavgi) (нганасаны): Krasnoyarsk Krai
Sami (old Russian name Lopars, i.e., Lapp) (саамы, саамы): Murmansk Oblast
Veps (*) (вепсы): Republic of Karelia, Leningrad Oblast
Yukaghirs (юкагиры): Sakha Republic, Chukotka Autonomous Okrug, Magadan Oblast

Central Siberia

Chulyms (чулымцы): Krasnoyarsk Krai
Evenks  (obsolete: Tungus) (эвенки): Sakha Republic, Krasnoyarsk Krai, Khabarovsk Krai, Amur Oblast, Sakhalin Oblast, Buryat Republic, Irkutsk Oblast, Chita Oblast, Tomsk Oblast, Tyumen Oblast
Evens (эвены) (obsolete: Lamuts (ламуты)): Sakha Republic, Khabarovsk Krai, Magadan Oblast, Chukotka Autonomous Okrug, Kamchatka Krai
Kets (кеты): Krasnoyarsk Krai
Khantys (Ostyaks, obsolete) (ханты)
Mansi (Voguls, obsolete) (манси): Khanty–Mansi Autonomous Okrug, Tyumen Oblast, Sverdlovsk Oblast, Komi Republic
Selkups (селькупы): Yamalo-Nenets Autonomous Okrug, Tyumen Oblast, Tomsk Oblast, Krasnoyarsk Krai
Teleuts (телеуты): Kemerovo Oblast

Far East
Nanais  (Russian plural: Nanaitsy) (нанайцы): Khabarovsk Krai, Primorsky Krai, Sakhalin Oblast
Negidals (негидальцы): Khabarovsk Krai
Nivkh people (нивхи): Khabarovsk Krai, Sakhalin Oblast
Oroch people (орочи): Khabarovsk Krai
Orok people (Ulta, Uilta) (ороки, ульта): Sakhalin Oblast
Taz people (тазы): Primorsky Krai
Udege people (удэгейцы): Primorsky Krai, Khabarovsk Krai
Ulch people (*) (ульчи): Khabarovsk Krai

Southern Siberia

Kumandins (кумандинцы): Altai Krai, Altai Republic, Kemerovo Oblast
Chelkans (челканцы): Altai Republic
Shorians (шорцы): Kemerovo Oblast, Republic of Khakassia, Altai Republic
Soyots (сойоты): Buryat Republic
Telengits (теленгиты): Altai Republic
Tofalars (тофалары): Irkutsk Oblast
Tubalars (тубалары): Altai Republic
Tuvans-Todzhins (Tuvintses-Todjintses, тувинцы-тоджинцы): Tuva Republic

Peoples of Dagestan with population less than 50,000
According to a 2000 decree of the government of Russian Federation, Dagestan was supposed to compile their own list of small-numbered indigenous peoples, to be included in the overall List of small-numbered indigenous peoples of Russia  The peoples below fall under the criteria of the decree, but were not included into the list in 2000.
Laks
Tabasarans
Rutuls
Aguls
Tsakhurs
Kumyks
Nogais

Tiny groups

there are about 40 other tiny ethnic groups in Dagestan, with total number of less than 40,000. 
Andis
Akhvakh
Archins
Bagvalals
Bezhta
Botlikhs
Chamalals
Godoberi
Hinukh
Hunzibs
Khwarshi
Karata
Tindis
Tsez

Other
Abazins (абазины): Karachay–Cherkessia
Ainu: some of them lived in southern Sakhalin and the Kuril Islands: assimilated
Besermyan (бесермяне): Udmurt Republic
Izhorians (ижорцы): Leningrad Oblast
Karelians (карелы): titular nation of the Republic of Karelia
Nagaybaks (нагайбаки): Chelyabinsk Oblast and Republic of Bashkortostan
Setos (Сету): Pskov Oblast
Shapsugs (шапсуги): Krasnodar Krai
Votes (Водь): Leningrad Oblast
Qaratay (каратаи): Republic of Tatarstan (no official recognition)

Median Age
Most peoples with smaller populations have median ages that are considerably lower than the Russian average. The below table is taken from the Russian census of 2002. For example, the median age of ethnic Russians was 37.6 years, while that of Yuraq Samoyeds was 26.2 years.

Birth Rate
The below table gives the average birth rate for Smaller Ethnic groups for the 1997-2002 period based on the 2002 census. (per 1000 people) Source:  For most of the groups the birth rate was more than the death rate. For example for the Yuraq Samoyeds the birth rate was more than double the death rate. But for ethnic groups like Veps (Death rate 7 times the birth rate) the reverse was true. For Ingrians, not a single birth was recorded in 1992-2002 period. The youngest of the Ingrians are 3 people in 10-14 age group (Total ethnic population 327, of which more than 60% are above 70 years of age. The 1989 population was 820, signifying a decline of 2.5 times)

See also

List of extinct indigenous peoples of Russia
Demographics of Siberia
Pomors
Kola Norwegians
List of indigenous peoples of Russia

References

External links
Russian Association of Indigenous Peoples of the North
UNESCO Red Book on endangered languages: Northeast Asia
Endangered Uralic Peoples
Minority languages of Russia on the Net
The Red Book of the peoples of the Russian Empire
Survival International article about the Northern indigenous peoples
L'auravetl'an Indigenous Information Network by Indigenous Peoples of Russia
 В погоне за малыми, an article about treatment of minorities in the Russian Empire, Kommersant-Money, October 25, 2005

Indigenous
Lists of indigenous peoples of Russia